In syntax, verb-second (V2) word order is a sentence structure in which the finite verb of a sentence or a clause is placed in the clause's second position, so that the verb is preceded by a single word or group of words (a single constituent).

Examples of V2 in English include (brackets indicating a single constituent):
 "Neither do I", "[Never in my life] have I seen such things"
If English used V2 in all situations, the following would be correct: 
 "*[In school] learned I about animals", "*[When she comes home from work] takes she a nap"

V2 word order is common in the Germanic languages and is also found in Northeast Caucasian Ingush, Uto-Aztecan O'odham, and fragmentarily in Romance Sursilvan (a Rhaeto-Romansh variety) and Finno-Ugric Estonian. Of the Germanic family, English is exceptional in having predominantly SVO order instead of V2, although there are vestiges of the V2 phenomenon.

Most Germanic languages do not normally use V2 order in embedded clauses, with a few exceptions. In particular, German, Dutch, and Afrikaans revert to VF (verb final) word order after a complementizer; Yiddish and Icelandic do, however, allow V2 in all declarative clauses: main, embedded, and subordinate. Kashmiri (an Indo-Aryan language) has V2 in 'declarative content clauses' but VF order in relative clauses.

Examples of verb second (V2)
The example sentences in (1) from German illustrate the V2 principle, which allows any constituent to occupy the first position as long as the second position is occupied by the finite verb. Sentences (1a) through to (1d) have the finite verb spielten 'played' in  second position, with various constituents occupying the first position: in (1a) the subject is in first position; in (1b) the object is;  in (1c) the temporal modifier is in first position; and in (1d) the locative modifier is in first position. 
   (1)     (a) Die Kinder       spielten      vor der Schule   im Park          Fußball.
               The children     played        before  school   in the park      Soccer
 
           (b) Fußball          spielten      die Kinder       vor der Schule   im Park.
               Soccer           played        the children     before school    in the park
 
           (c) Vor der Schule   spielten      die Kinder       im Park          Fußball.
               Before school    played        the children     in the park      soccer.
 
           (d) Im Park          spielten      die Kinder       vor der Schule   Fußball.
               In the park      played        the children     before school    soccer.

Classical accounts of verb second (V2) 
In major theoretical research on V2 properties, researchers discussed that verb-final orders found in German and Dutch embedded clauses suggest that there is an underlying SOV order with specific syntactic movements rules that changes the underlying SOV order to derive a surface form where the finite verb is in the second position of the clause.

We first see a "verb preposing" rule which moves the finite verb to the left most position in sentence, then a "constituent preposing" rule which moves a constituent in front of the finite verb. Following these two rules will always result with the finite verb in second position. 
 "I like the man"
 
           (a) Ich  den  Mann  mag          --> Underlying form in Modern German
               I    the  man   like
 
           (b) mag   ich  den  Mann         --> Verb movement to left edge
               like  I    the  man
 
           (c) den  Mann  mag   ich         --> Constituent moved to left edge
               the  man   like  I

Non-finite verbs and embedded clauses

Non-finite verbs
The V2 principle regulates the position of finite verbs only; its influence on non-finite verbs (infinitives, participles, etc.) is indirect. Non-finite verbs in V2 languages appear in varying positions depending on the language. In German and Dutch, for instance, non-finite verbs appear after the object (if one is present) in clause final position in main clauses (OV order). Swedish and Icelandic, in contrast, position non-finite verbs after the finite verb but before the object (if one is present) (VO order). That is, V2 operates on only the finite verb.

V2 in embedded clauses

(In the following examples, finite verb forms are in bold, non-finite verb forms are in italics and subjects are underlined.)

Germanic languages vary in the application of V2 order in embedded clauses. They fall into three groups.

V2 in Swedish, Danish, Norwegian, Faroese

In these languages, the word order of clauses is generally fixed in two patterns of conventionally numbered positions. Both end with positions for (5) non-finite verb forms, (6) objects, and (7), adverbials.

In main clauses, the V2 constraint holds. The finite verb must be in position (2) and sentence adverbs in position (4). The latter include words with meanings such as 'not' and 'always'. The subject may be position (1), but when a topical expression occupies the position, the subject is in position (3).

In embedded clauses, the V2 constraint is absent. After the conjunction, the subject must immediately follow; it cannot be replaced by a topical expression. Thus, the first four positions are in the fixed order (1) conjunction, (2) subject, (3) sentence adverb, (4) finite verb

The position of the sentence adverbs is important to those theorists who see them as marking the start of a large constituent within the clause. Thus the finite verb is seen as inside that constituent in embedded clauses, but outside that constituent in V2 main clauses.

Swedish
{|cellspacing="8"

||main clauseembedded clause|||||Front— ||Finite verbConjunction||SubjectSubject||Sentence adverbSentence adverb||—Finite verb||Non-finite verbNon-finite verb||ObjectObject||AdverbialAdverbial
|-
||main clause||a.||I dag||ville||Lotte||inte||||läsa||tidningen
|-
||||||1||2||3||4||||5||6
|-
||||||today||wanted||Lotte||not||||read||the newspaper||||...
|-
||||
|colspan=7|'Lotte didn't want to read the paper today.'
|-
||embedded clause||b.||||att||Lotte||inte||ville||koka||kaffe|| i dag
|-
||||||||1||2||3||4||5||6||7
|-
||||||||that||Lotte||not||wanted||brew||coffee||today||...||
|-
||||
|colspan=7|'that Lotte didn't want to make coffee today'
|-
|}
 Main clause           Front    Finite verb    Subject    Sentence adverb    __            Non-finite verb     Object           Adverbial
 Embedded clause       __       Conjunction    Subject    Sentence adverb    Finite verb   Non-finite verb     Object           Adverbial
 
 Main clause      (a)  I dag    ville          Lotte      inte                             läsa                tidningen
                       today    wanted         Lotte      not                              read                the newspaper
                       "Lotte didn't want to read the paper today."
 
 
 Embedded clause  (b)           att            Lotte      inte               ville         koka                kaffe             i dag
                                that           Lotte      not                wanted        brew                coffee            today
                       "that Lotte didn't want to make coffee today."
Danish
{|cellspacing="8"

||main clauseembedded clause|||||Front— ||Finite verbConjunction||SubjectSubject||Sentence adverbSentence adverb||—Finite verb||Non-finite verbNon-finite verb||ObjectObject||AdverbialAdverbial
|-
||main clause||a.||Klaus||er||||ikke||||kommet
|-
||||||1||2||||4||||5
|-
||||||Klaus||is|| ||not||||come||||||
|-
||||
|colspan=7|...'Klaus hasn't come.'
|-
||embedded clause||b.||||når||Klaus||ikke||er||kommet
|-
||||||||1||2||3||4||5
|-
||||||||when||Klaus||not||is||come||||
|-
||||
|colspan=7|...'when Klaus hasn't come'
|-
|}
So-called Perkerdansk is an example of a variety that does not follow the above.

Norwegian 
(with multiple adverbials and multiple non-finite forms, in two varieties of the language)
{|cellspacing="8"

||mainembedded|||||Front— ||Finite verbConjunction||SubjectSubject||Sentence adverbSentence adverb||—Finite verb||Non-finite verbNon-finite verb||ObjectObject||AdverbialAdverbial
|||
|-
||main clause||a.||Den gangen||hadde||han||dessverre ikke||||villet sende||sakspapirene||før møtet.|| ||(Bokmål variety)
|-
||||||1||2||3||4||||5||6||7||
|-
||||||that time||had||he||unfortunately not||||wanted to send||the documents||before the meeting||... 
|-
||||
|colspan=7|'This time he had unfortunately not wanted to send the documents before the meeting.'
|-
||embedded clause||b.||||av di||han||denne gongen diverre ikkje||hadde||vilja senda||sakspapira||føre møtet.|| ||(Nynorsk variety)
|-
||||||||1||2||3||4||5||6||7
|-
||||||||because||he||this time unfortunately not||had||wanted to send||the documents||before the meeting||... 
|-
||||
|colspan=7|'because this time he had unfortunately not wanted to send the documents before the meeting.'
|-
|}
Faroese
Unlike continental Scandinavian languages, the sentence adverb may either precede or follow the finite verb in embedded clauses. A (3a) slot is inserted here for the following sentence adverb alternative.
{|cellspacing="8"
||main clauseembedded clause|||||Front— ||Finite verbConjunction||SubjectSubject||Sentence adverbSentence adverb||—Finite verb||—Sentence adverb||Non-finite verbNon-finite verb||ObjectObject||AdverbialAdverbial||
|-
||main clause||a.||Her||man||fólk||ongantíð||||||hava fingið||fisk||fyrr
|-
||||||1||2||3||4||||||5||6||7
|-
||||||here||must||people||never||||||have caught||fish||before||...
|-
||||
|colspan=7|'People have surely never caught fish here before.'
|-
||embedded clause||b.||||hóast||fólk||ongantíð ||hevur|||| fingið|| fisk ||her
|-
||||||||1||2||3||4||||5||6||7
|-
||||||||although||people||never||have||||caught||fish||here
|-
|-
||||c.||||hóast||fólk||||hevur||ongantíð||fingið|| fisk ||her
|-
||||||||1||2||||4||(3a)||5||6||7
|-
||||||||although||people||||have||never||caught||fish||here||...
|-
||||
|colspan=7|'although people have never caught fish here'
|-
|}

V2 in German 
In main clauses, the V2 constraint holds. As with other Germanic languages, the finite verb must be in the second position. However, any non-finite forms must be in final position. The subject may be in the first position, but when a topical expression occupies the position, the subject follows the finite verb.

In embedded clauses, the V2 constraint does not hold. The finite verb form must be adjacent to any non-finite at the end of the clause.

German grammarians traditionally divide sentences into fields. Subordinate clauses preceding the main clause are said to be in the first field (Vorfeld), clauses following the main clause in the final field (Nachfeld). 
The central field (Mittelfeld) contains most or all of a clause, and is bounded by left bracket (Linke Satzklammer) and right bracket (Rechte Satzklammer) positions.

In main clauses, the initial element (subject or topical expression) is said to be located in the first field, the V2 finite verb form in the left bracket, and any non-finite verb forms in the right bracket.In embedded clauses, the conjunction is said to be located in the left bracket, and the verb forms in the right bracket. In German embedded clauses, a finite verb form follows any non-finite forms.

German
{|cellspacing="8"

 ||||| First field ||Left bracket||Central field||||||||Right bracket ||||||Final field
|-
| Main clause||a.||Er || hat |||dich ||gestern ||nicht |||| angerufen ||||||weil er dich nicht stören wollte. 
|-
|||||he || has || you ||yesterday|| not || ||rung|| || ||
|-
||||
|colspan=10|... 'He didn't ring you yesterday because he didn't want to disturb you.'
|-
| || b. || Sobald er Zeit hat || wird || er || dich||||||anrufen
|-
| || || As soon as he has time || will ||he || you||||||ring ||||||
|-
||||
|colspan=10|...'When he has time he will ring you.'
|-
| Embedded clause||c.||||dass || er |||dich ||gestern ||nicht || angerufen hat
|-
|||||||that || he |||you ||yesterday ||not || rung has||||||
|-
||||
|colspan=10|...'that he didn't ring you yesterday'
|-
|}

V2 in Dutch and Afrikaans 

V2 word order is used in main clauses, the finite verb must be in the second position. However, in subordinate clauses two word orders are possible for the verb clusters.

Main clauses:

Dutch
{|cellspacing="8"
 ||||| First field ||Left bracket||Central field||||||||Right bracket ||||Final field
|-
| Main clause||a.||De Māori || hebben |||Nieuw-Zeeland |||||||| ontdekt 
|-
|||||The Māori || have |||New Zealand |||||||| discovered||||
|-
||||
|colspan=7|...'The Māori discovered New Zealand.' 
|-
|||b.||Tussen ongeveer 1250 en 1300||ontdekten||de Māori |||Nieuw-Zeeland |||||||| 
|-
|||||Between approximately 1250 and 1300||discovered||the Māori |||New Zealand |||||||||||
|-
||||
|colspan=7|...'Between about 1250 and 1300, the Māori discovered New Zealand.'
|-
|||c.||Niemand||had|| |||||||||gedacht ||||dat ook maar iets zou gebeuren.
|-
|||||Nobody||had|| |||||||||thought ||||
|-
||||
|colspan=7|...'Nobody figured that anything would happen.'
|-
| Embedded clause||d.||||dat || de Māori || Nieuw-Zeeland ||||||| hebben ontdekt
|-
|||||||that || the Māori ||New Zealand ||||||| have discovered ||||
|-
||||
|colspan=7|...'that the Māori discovered New Zealand'
|-
|}
This analysis suggests a close parallel between the V2 finite form in main clauses and the conjunctions in embedded clauses. Each is seen as an introduction to its clause-type, a function which some modern scholars have equated with the notion of specifier. The analysis is supported in spoken Dutch by the placement of clitic pronoun subjects. Forms such as ze cannot stand alone, unlike the full-form equivalent zij. The words to which they may be attached are those same introduction words: the V2 form in a main clause, or the conjunction in an embedded clause. 

{|cellspacing="8"
 ||||| First field ||Left bracket||Central field||||||||||Right bracket ||||Final field
|-
|Main clause||e.||Tussen ongeveer 1250 en 1300||ontdekten-ze|||Nieuw-Zeeland |||||||| 
|-
|||||between approximately 1250 and 1300||discovered-they||New Zealand |||||||||||||||
|-
||||
|colspan=5|...'Between about 1250 and 1300, they discovered New Zealand.'
|-
| Embedded clause||f.||||dat-ze|||tussen ongeveer 1250 en 1300||Nieuw-Zeeland |||||||| hebben ontdekt
|-
|||||||that-they||between approximately 1250 and 1300||New Zealand ||||||||| have discovered ||||
|-
||||
|colspan=5|...'that they discovered New Zealand between about 1250 and 1300'
|-
|}

Subordinate clauses:

In Dutch subordinate clauses two word orders are possible for the verb clusters and are referred to as the "red": omdat ik heb gewerkt, "because I have worked": like in English, where the auxiliary verb precedes the past particle, and the "green": omdat ik gewerkt heb, where the past particle precedes the auxiliary verb, "because I worked have": like in German. In Dutch, the green word order is the most used in speech, and the red is the most used in writing, particularly in journalistic texts, but the green is also used in writing as is the red in speech. Unlike in English however adjectives and adverbs must precede the verb: ''dat het boek groen is'', "that the book green is".

{|cellspacing="8"
 ||||| First field ||Left bracket||Central field||||||||Right bracket ||||Final field
|-
| Embedded clause||g.||||omdat|| ik|||het|| dan |||| gezien zou hebben |||| most common in the Netherlands
|-
|||||||because|| I|||it|| then |||| seen would have
|-
|||h.||||omdat|| ik|||het|| dan ||||  zou gezien hebben |||| most common in Belgium 
|-
|||||||because|| I|||it|| then |||| would seen have
|-
|||i.||||omdat|| ik|||het|| dan ||||  zou hebben gezien |||| often used in writing in both countries, but common in speech as well, most common in Limburg
|-
|||||||because|| I|||it|| then |||| would have seen
|-
|||j.||||omdat|| ik|||het|| dan |||| gezien hebben zou ||||used in Friesland, Groningen and Drenthe, least common but used as well
|-
|||||||because|| I|||it|| then |||| seen have would||||
|-
||||
|colspan=5|...'because then I would have seen it'
|-
|}

V2 in Icelandic and Yiddish
These languages freely allow V2 order in embedded clauses.

Icelandic
Two word-order patterns are largely similar to continental Scandinavian. However, in main clauses an extra slot is needed for when the front position is occupied by Það. In these clauses the subject follows any sentence adverbs. In embedded clauses, sentence adverbs follow the finite verb (an optional order in Faroese).
{|cellspacing="8"
||main clauseembedded clause|||||Front— ||Finite verbConjunction||SubjectSubject||—Finite verb||Sentence adverbSentence adverb||Subject—||Non-finite verbNon-finite verb||ObjectObject||AdverbialAdverbial
|-
||main clause||a.||Margir||höfðu||||||aldrei||||lokið||verkefninu.
|-
|||||Many||had||||||never||||finished||the assignment ||||...||'Many had never finished the assignment.'
|-
|||b.||Það||höfðu||||||aldrei||margir||lokið||verkefninu.
|-
|||||there||have||||||never||many||finished||the assignment||||...||'There were never many people who had finished the assignment.'
|-
||||c.||Bókina||hefur||María||||ekki||||lesið.
|-
||||||the book||has||Mary|||||not||||read||||||...||'Mary hasn't read the book.'
|-
||embedded clause||d.||||hvort||María ||hefur||ekki||||lesið||bokina.
|-
||||||||whether||Mary||has|| |not||||read||the book||||...||'whether Mary hasn't read the book'
|-
|}
In more radical contrast with other Germanic languages, a third pattern exists for embedded clauses with the conjunction followed by the V2 order: front-finite verb-subject.
{|cellspacing="8"
|||||||Conjunction||Front(Topic adverbial)||Finite verb||Subject
|-
||e.||Jón||efast||um að||á morgun||fari||María||snemma||á fætur.
|-
|||John||doubts||that||tomorrow||get||Mary||early||up||... ||'John doubts that Mary will get up early tomorrow.'
|-
||||||||Conjunction||Front(Object)||Finite verb||Subject
|-
||f.||Jón||harmar||að||þessa bók||skuli||ég||hafa||lesið.
|-
|||John||regrets||that||this book||shall||I||have||read||... ||'John regrets that I have read this book.'
|}

Yiddish
Unlike Standard German, Yiddish normally has verb forms before Objects (SVO order), and in embedded clauses has conjunction followed by V2 order.
{|cellspacing="8"
 ||||Front(Subject)||Finite verb||||||||Conjunction||Front(Subject)||Finite verb||
|-
||a.||ikh||hob||||gezen||mitvokh,||az||ikh||vel||nit||kenen||kumen||donershtik
|-
||||I||have||||seen||Wednesday||that||I|||will||not||can||come||Thursday||...||'I saw on Wednesday that I wouldn't be able to come on Thursday.'
|-
 ||||Front(Adverbial)||Finite verb||Subject||||||Conjunction||Front(Adverbial)||Finite verb||Subject
|-
||b.|| mitvokh||hob||ikh|||gezen,||||az||donershtik||vel||ikh||nit||kenen||kumen
|-
||||Wednesday||have||I||seen||||that||Thursday|||will||I||not||can||come||...||On Wednesday I saw that on Thursday I wouldn't be able to come.'
|-
|}

V2 in root clauses
One type of embedded clause with V2 following the conjunction is found throughout the Germanic languages, although it is more common in some than it is others. These are termed root clauses. They are declarative content clauses, the direct objects of so-called bridge verbs, which are understood to quote a statement. For that reason, they exhibit the V2 word order of the equivalent direct quotation.

Danish
Items other than the subject are allowed to appear in front position.
{|cellspacing="8"

|||||||Conjunction||Front(Subject)||||Finite verb||
|-
||a.||Vi||ved||at||Bo||ikke||har||læst||denne bog
|-
||||We||know||that||Bo||not||has||read||this book||...||'We know that Bo has not read this book.'
|-
|||||||Conjunction||Front(Object)||Finite verb||Subject
|-
||b.||Vi||ved||at||denne bog||har||Bo||ikke||læst
|-
||||We||know||that|| this book ||has|||Bo||not||read||...||'We know that Bo has not read this book.'
|-
|}
Swedish
Items other than the subject are occasionally allowed to appear in front position. Generally, the statement must be one with which the speaker agrees.
{|cellspacing="8"
|||||||Conjunction||Front(Adverbial)||Finite verb||Subject
|-
||d.||Jag||tror||att||i det fallet||har||du||rätt
|-
||||I||think||that|| in that respect ||have|||you||right||...||'I think that in that respect you are right.'
|-
|}
This order is not possible with a statement with which the speaker does not agree.
{|cellspacing="8"
|||||||||Conjunction||Front(Adverbial)||Finite verb||Subject
|-
||e.||*Jag||tror||inte||att||i det fallet||har||du||rätt||||||(The asterisk signals that the sentence is not grammatically acceptable.)
|-
||||I||think||not||that|| in that respect ||have|||you||right||...||'I don't think that in that respect you are right.'
|-
|}
Norwegian
{|cellspacing="8"
|||||||Conjunction||Front(Adverbial)||Finite verb||Subject
|-
||f.||hun||fortalte||at||til fødselsdagen||hadde||hun||fått||kunstbok|||| ||(Bokmål variety)
|-
||||she||told||that||for her birthday||had'||she||received||art-book||...||'She said that for her birthday she had been given a book on art.'
|-
|}
German
Root clause V2 order is possible only when the conjunction dass is omitted. In such cases, formal usage also places the finite verb form into the present subjunctive (German Konjunktiv I) if the verb form is clearly distinguishable from the indicative; if not, the past subjunctive (German Konjunktiv II) is used.
{|cellspacing="8"
|||||||Conjunction||Front(Subject)||Finite verb
|-
||g.||*Er||behauptet,||dass||er||hat||es||zur Post||gebracht||||||(The asterisk signals that the sentence is not grammatically acceptable.)
|-
||h.||Er||behauptet,||||er||habe||es||zur Post||gebracht
|-
||||he||claims||(that)||he||has||it||to the post office||taken||...||'He claims that he took it to the post office.'
|-
|
|} By contrast, a form with an embedded first-person subject would usually use the past subjunctive here, since the present indicative and subjunctive appear identical: Er behauptet, ich hätte (instead of habe) es zur Post gebracht.
Compare the normal embed-clause order after dass
{|cellspacing="8"
 |||||  ||Left bracket(Conjunction)||Central field||Right bracket(Verb forms) 
|-
||i.||Er||behauptet,||dass||er es zur Post||gebracht hat
|-
||||he||claims||that||he it to the post office||taken has
|-
|}

Perspective effects on embedded V2 
There are a limited number of V2 languages that can allow for embedded verb movement for a specific pragmatic effect similar to that of English. This is due to the perspective of the speaker. Languages such as German and Swedish have embedded verb second. The embedded verb second in these kinds of languages usually occur after 'bridge verbs'.

(Bridge verbs are common verbs of speech and thoughts such as "say", "think", and "know", and the word "that" is not needed after these verbs. For example: I think he is coming.)

Based on an assertion theory, the perspective of a speaker is reaffirmed in embedded V2 clauses. A speaker's sense of commitment to or responsibility for V2 in embedded clauses is greater than a non-V2 in embedded clause. This is the result of V2 characteristics. As shown in the examples below, there is a greater commitment to the truth in the embedded clause when V2 is in place.

Variations of V2 
Variations of V2 order such as V1 (verb-initial word order), V3 and V4 orders are widely attested in many Early Germanic and Medieval Romance languages. These variations are possible in the languages however it is severely restricted to specific contexts.

V1 word order 
V1 (verb-initial word order)  is a type of structure that contains the finite verb as the initial clause element. In other words the verb appears before the subject and the object of the sentence.
           (a) Max y-il    [s no' tx;i;] [o naq Lwin].    (Mayan) 
               PFV A3-see  CLF dog       CLF Pedro 
               'The dog saw Pedro.'

V3 word order 
V3 (verb-third word order) is a variation of V2 in which the finite verb is in third position with two constituents preceding it. In V3, like in V2 word order, the constituents preceding the finite verb are not categorically restricted, as the constituents can be a DP, a PP, a CP and so on.

V2 and left edge filling trigger (LEFT) 
V2 is fundamentally derived from a morphological obligatory exponence effect at sentence level. The left edge filling trigger (LEFT) effects are usually seen in classical V2 languages such as Germanic languages and Old Romance languages. The left edge filling trigger is independently active in morphology as EPP effects are found in word-internal levels. The obligatory exponence derives from absolute displacement, ergative displacement and ergative doubling in inflectional morphology. In addition, second position rules in clitic second languages demonstrate post-syntactic rules of LEFT movement. Using the language Breton as an example, absence of a pre-tense expletive will allow for the LEFT to occur to avoid tense-first. The LEFT movement is free from syntactic rules which is evidence for a post-syntactic phenomenon. With the LEFT movement, V2 word order can be obtained as seen in the example below.

In this Breton example, the finite head is phonetically realized and agrees with the category of the preceding element. The pre-tense "Bez" is used in front of the finite verb to obtain the V2 word order. (finite verb "nevo" is bolded).

Syntactic verb second 
It is said that V2 patterns are a syntactic phenomenon and therefore have certain environments where it can and cannot be tolerated. Syntactically, V2 requires a left-peripheral head (usually C) with an occupied specifier and paired with raising the highest verb-auxiliary to that head.  V2 is usually analyzed as the co-occurrence of these requirements, which can also be referred to as "triggers". The left-peripheral head, which is a requirement that causes the effect of V2, sets further requirements on a phrase XP that occupies the initial position, so that this phrase XP may always have specific featural characteristics.

V2 in English

Modern English differs greatly in word order from other modern Germanic languages, but earlier English shared many similarities. For this reason, some scholars propose a description of Old English with V2 constraint as the norm. The history of English syntax is thus seen as a process of losing the constraint.

Old English

Main clauses

Position of object
In examples b, c and d, the object of the clause precedes a non-finite verb form. Superficially, the structure is verb-subject-object- verb. To capture generalities, scholars of syntax and linguistic typology treat them as basically subject-object-verb (SOV) structure, modified by the V2 constraint. Thus Old English is classified, to some extent, as an SOV language. However, example a represents a number of Old English clauses with object following a non-finite verb form, with the superficial structure verb-subject-verb object. A more substantial number of clauses contain a single finite verb form followed by an object, superficially verb-subject-object. Again, a generalisation is captured by describing these as subject–verb–object (SVO) modified by V2. Thus Old English can be described as intermediate between SOV languages (like German and Dutch) and SVO languages (like Swedish and Icelandic).

Effect of subject pronouns
When the subject of a clause was a personal pronoun, V2 did not always operate.

However, V2 verb-subject inversion occurred without exception after a question word or the negative ne, and with few exceptions after þa even with pronominal subjects.

Inversion of a subject pronoun also occurred regularly after a direct quotation.

Embedded clauses
Embedded clauses with pronoun subjects were not subject to V2. Even with noun subjects, V2 inversion did not occur.

Yes-no questions
In a similar clause pattern, the finite verb form of a yes-no question occupied the first position

Middle English

Continuity
Early Middle English generally preserved V2 structure in clauses with nominal subjects.

 
As in Old English, V2 inversion did not apply to clauses with pronoun subjects.

Change
Late Middle English texts of the fourteenth and fifteenth centuries show increasing incidence of clauses without the inversion associated with V2.

Negative clauses were no longer formed with ne (or na) as the first element. Inversion in negative clauses was attributable to other causes.

Vestiges in Modern English

As in earlier periods, Modern English normally has subject-verb order in declarative clauses and inverted verb-subject order in interrogative clauses. However these norms are observed irrespective of the number of clause elements preceding the verb.

Classes of verbs in Modern English: auxiliary and lexical
Inversion in Old English sentences with a combination of two verbs could be described in terms of their finite and non-finite forms. The word which participated in inversion was the finite verb; the verb which retained its position relative to the object was the non-finite verb. In most types of Modern English clause, there are two verb forms, but the verbs are considered to belong to different syntactic classes. The verbs which participated in inversion have evolved to form a class of auxiliary verbs which may mark tense, aspect and mood; the remaining majority of verbs with full semantic value are said to constitute the class of lexical verbs. The exceptional type of clause is that of declarative clause with a lexical verb in a present simple or past simple form.

Questions
Like Yes/No questions, interrogative Wh- questions are regularly formed with inversion of subject and auxiliary. Present Simple and Past Simple questions are formed with the auxiliary do, a process known as do-support. 
{|cellspacing="8"
||a. Which game is Sam watching? 
|-
||b. Where does she live?
|}
(see subject-auxiliary inversion in questions)

With topic adverbs and adverbial phrases
In certain patterns similar to Old and Middle English, inversion is possible. However, this is a matter of stylistic choice, unlike the constraint on interrogative clauses.

negative or restrictive adverbial first  
{|cellspacing="8"

||c. At no point will he drink Schnapps.
|-
||d. No sooner had she arrived than she started to make demands.
|}
(see negative inversion)
comparative adverb or adjective first
{|cellspacing="8"

||e. So keenly did the children miss their parents, they cried themselves to sleep.
|-
||f. Such was their sadness, they could never enjoy going out.
|}
After the preceding classes of adverbial, only auxiliary verbs, not lexical verbs, participate in inversion

locative or temporal adverb first
{|cellspacing="8"

||g. Here comes the bus.
|-
||h. Now is the hour when we must say goodbye.
|}
prepositional phrase first 
{|cellspacing="8"
||i. Behind the goal sat many photographers. 
|-
||j. Down the road came the person we were waiting for.
|}
(see locative inversion, directive inversion)

After the two latter types of adverbial, only one-word lexical verb forms (Present Simple or Past Simple), not auxiliary verbs, participate in inversion, and only with noun-phrase subjects, not pronominal subjects.

Direct quotations
When the object of a verb is a verbatim quotation, it may precede the verb, with a result similar to Old English V2. Such clauses are found in storytelling and in news reports.
{|cellspacing="8"
||k. "Wolf! Wolf!" cried the boy.
|-
||l. "The unrest is spreading throughout the country," writes our Jakarta correspondent.
|}
(see quotative inversion)

Declarative clauses without inversion
Corresponding to the above examples, the following clauses show the normal Modern English subject-verb order.

Declarative equivalents
{|cellspacing="8"

||a′. Sam is watching the Cup games.
|-
||b′. She lives in the country.
|}
Equivalents without topic fronting
{|cellspacing="8"

|-
||c′. He will at no point drink Schnapps.
|-
||d′. She had no sooner arrived than she started to make demands.
|-
||e′. The children missed their parents so keenly that they cried themselves to sleep.
|-f′. Their sadness was such that they could never enjoy going out.
|-
||g′. The bus is coming here.
|-
||h′. The hour when we must say goodbye is now.
|-
||i′. Many photographers sat behind the goal.
|-
||j′. The person we were waiting for came down the road.
|-
||k′. The boy cried "Wolf! Wolf!"
|-
||l′. Our Jakarta correspondent writes, "The unrest is spreading throughout the country" .
|}

French

Modern French is a subject-verb-object (SVO) language like other Romance languages (though Latin was a subject-object-verb language). However, V2 constructions existed in Old French and were more common than in other early Romance language texts. It has been suggested that this may be due to influence from the Germanic Frankish language. Modern French has vestiges of the V2 system similar to those found in modern English.

The following sentences have been identified as possible examples of V2 syntax in Old French:

{|cellspacing="3"
||a. ||Old French||Longetemps||fu||ly||roys||Elinas||en||la||montaigne
|-
||||Modern French||Longtemps||fut||le||roi||Elinas||dans||la||montagne||....||'Pendant longtemps le roi Elinas a été dans les montagnes.'
|-
||||English||For a long time||was||the||king||Elinas||in||the||mountain||...||'King Elinas was in the mountains for a long time.'
|-
|}
{|cellspacing="1"
||b. ||Old French||Iteuses||paroles||distrent||li||frere||de||Lancelot
|-
||||Modern French||Telles||paroles||dirent||les||frères||de||Lancelot||....||'Les frères de Lancelot ont dit ces paroles'
|-
||||English||Such||words||uttered||the||brothers||of||Lancelot||....||'Lancelot's brothers spoke these words.'
|-
|}
{|cellspacing="1"
||c.|| Old French||Atant||regarda||contreval||la ||mer
|-
||||Modern French||Alors||regarda||en bas||la||mer||....||'Alors Il a regardé la mer plus bas.' 
|-
||||English||Then||looked at||downward||the||sea||....||'Then he looked down at the sea.' (Elision of subject pronoun, contrary to the general rule in other Old French clause structures.)
|-
|}

Old French
Similarly to Modern French, Old French allows a range of constituents to precede the finite verb in the V2 position.

Old Occitan
A language that is compared to Old French is Old Occitan, which is said to be the sister of Old French. Although the two languages are thought to be sister languages, Old Occitan exhibits a relaxed V2 whereas Old French has a much more strict V2. However, the differences between the two languages extend past V2 and also differ in a variation of V2, which is V3. In both language varieties, occurrence of V3 can be triggered by the presence of an initial frame-setting clause or adverbial (1).

Other languages

Kotgarhi and Kochi

In his 1976 three-volume study of two languages of Himachal Pradesh, Hendriksen reports on two intermediate cases: Kotgarhi and Kochi. Although neither language shows a regular V-2 pattern, they have evolved to the point that main and subordinate clauses differ in word order and auxiliaries may separate from other parts of the verb:

Hendriksen reports that relative clauses in Kochi show a greater tendency to have the finite verbal element in clause-final position than matrix clauses do (III:188).

Ingush

In Ingush, "for main clauses, other than episode-initial and other all-new ones, verb-second order is most common. The verb, or the finite part of a compound verb or analytic tense form (i.e. the light verb or the auxiliary), follows the first word or phrase in the clause."

O'odham

O'odham has relatively free V2 word order within clauses; for example, all of the following sentences mean "the boy brands the pig":
           ceoj ʼo g ko:jĭ ceposid
           ko:jĭ ʼo g ceoj ceposid
           ceoj ʼo ceposid g ko:jĭ
           ko:jĭ ʼo ceposid g ceoj
           ceposid ʼo g ceoj g ko:jĭ
           ceposid ʼo g ko:jĭ g ceoj
 The finite verb is "'o" which appears after a constituent, in second position

Despite the general freedom of sentence word order, O'odham is fairly strictly verb-second in its placement of the auxiliary verb (in the above sentences, it is ʼo; in the following it is ʼañ):
           Affirmative: cipkan ʼañ = "I am working"
           Negative: pi ʼañ cipkan = "I am not working" [not *pi cipkan ʼañ]

Sursilvan

Among dialects of the Romansh, V2 word order is limited to Sursilvan, the insertion of entire phrases between auxiliary verbs and participles occurs, as in 'Cun Mariano Tschuor ha Augustin Beeli discurriu ' ('Mariano Tschuor has spoken with Augustin Beeli'), as compared to Engadinese 'Cun Rudolf Gasser ha discurrü Gion Peider Mischol' ('Rudolf Gasser has spoken with Gion Peider Mischol'.)

The constituent that is bounded by the auxiliary, ha, and the participle, discurriu, is known as a Satzklammer or 'verbal bracket'.

Estonian
In Estonian, V2 word order is very frequent in the literate register, but less frequent in the spoken register. When V2 order does occur, it is found in main clauses, as illustrated in (1). 

Unlike Germanic V2 languages, Estonian has several instances where V2 word order is not attested in embedded clauses, such as wh-interrogatives (2), exclamatives (3), and non-subject-initial clauses (4).

Welsh
In Welsh, V2 word order is found in Middle Welsh, but not in Old and Modern Welsh which only has verb-initial order. Middle Welsh displays three characteristics of V2 grammar: 
          (1)	A finite verb in the C-domain
          (2)	The constituent preceding the verb can be any constituent (often driven by pragmatic features). 
          (3)	Only one constituent preceding the verb in subject position

As we can see in the examples of V2 in Welsh below, there is only one constituent preceding the finite verb, but any kind of constituent (such as a noun phrase NP, adverb phrase AP and preposition phrase PP) can occur in this position.

 

Middle Welsh can also exhibit variations of V2 such as cases of V1 (verb-initial word order) and V3 orders. However, these variations are restricted to specific contexts such as in sentences that has impersonal verbs, imperatives, answers or direct responses to questions or commands and idiomatic sayings. It is also possible to have a preverbal particle preceding the verb in V2, however these kind of sentences are limited as well.

Wymysorys 
Wymysory is classified as a West-Germanic language, however it can exhibit various Slavonic characteristics. It is argued that Wymysorys enables its speaker to operate between two word order system that represent two forces driving the grammar of this language Germanic and Slavonic. The Germanic system is not as flexible and allows for V2 order to exist in it form while the Slavonic system is relatively free. Due to the rigid word order in the Germanic system, the placement of the verb is determines by syntactic rules in which V2 word order is commonly respected. 

Wymysory, like with other languages that exhibit V2 word order, the finite verb is in second position with a constituent of any category preceding the verb such as DP, PP, AP and so on.

Classical Portuguese  
Compared to other Romance languages, the V2 word order has existed in Classical Portuguese a lot longer. Although Classical Portuguese is a V2 language, V1 occurred more frequently and as a result of this, it is argued whether or not Classical Portuguese really is a V2-like language. However, Classical Portuguese is a relaxed V2 language, meaning V2 patterns coexist with its variations, which are V1 and/or V3. In the case of Classical Portuguese, there is a strong relationship between V1 and V2 due to V2 clauses being derived from V1 clauses. In languages, such as Classical Portuguese, where both V1 and V2 exist, both patterns depend on the movement of the verb to a high position of the CP layer, with the difference being whether or not a phrase is moved to a preverbal position. 

Although V1 occurred more frequently in Classical Portuguese, V2 is the more frequent order found in matrix clauses. Post-verbal subjects may also occupy a high position in the clause and can precede VP adverbs. In (1) and (2), we can see that the adverb 'bem' can precede or proceed the post-verbal subject. 

In (2), the post-verbal subject is understood as an informational focus, but the same cannot be said for (1) because the difference of the positions determine how the subject is interpreted.

Structural analysis of V2 
Various structural analyses of V2 have been developed, including within the model of dependency grammar and generative grammar.

Structural analysis in dependency grammar 

Dependency grammar (DG) can accommodate the V2 phenomenon simply by stipulating that one and only one constituent can be a predependent of the finite verb (i.e. a dependent which precedes its head) in declarative (matrix) clauses (in this, Dependency Grammar assumes only one clausal level and one position of the verb, instead of a distinction between a VP-internal and a higher clausal position of the verb as in Generative Grammar, cf. the next section). On this account, the V2 principle is violated if the finite verb has more than one predependent or no predependent at all. The following DG structures of the first four German sentences above illustrate the analysis (the sentence means 'The kids play soccer in the park before school'):

The finite verb spielen is the root of all clause structure. The V2 principle requires that this root have a single predependent, which it does in each of the four sentences.

The four English sentences above involving the V2 phenomenon receive the following analyses:

Structural analysis in generative grammar 

In the theory of Generative Grammar, the verb second phenomenon has been described as an application of X-bar theory. The combination of a first position for a phrase and a second position for a single verb has been identified as the combination of specifier and head of a phrase. The part after the finite verb is then the complement. While the sentence structure of English is usually analysed in terms of three levels, CP, IP, and VP, in German linguistics the consensus has emerged that there is no IP in German.

The VP (verb phrase) structure assigns position and functions to the arguments of the verb. Hence, this structure is shaped by the grammatical properties of the V (verb) which heads the structure. 
The CP (complementizer phrase) structure incorporates the grammatical information which identifies the clause as declarative or interrogative, main or embedded. The structure is shaped by the abstract C (complementiser) which is considered the head of the structure. In embedded clauses the C position accommodates complementizers. In German declarative main clauses, C hosts the finite verb.
Thus the V2 structure is analysed as 
1 Topic element (specifier of CP)
2 Finite-verb form (C=head of CP) i.e. verb-second
3 Remainder of the clause

In embedded clauses, the C position is occupied by a complementizer. In most Germanic languages (but not in Icelandic or Yiddish), this generally prevents the finite verb from moving to C. 
The structure is analysed as
1 Complementizer (C=head of CP)
2 Bulk of clause (VP), including, in German, the subject.
3 Finite verb (V position)

This analysis does not provide a structure for the instances in some language of root clauses after bridge verbs. 
Example: Danish Vi ved at denne bog har Bo ikke læst with the object of the embedded clause fronted.
 (Literally 'We know that this book has Bo not read')
The solution is to allow verbs such as ved to accept a clause with a second (recursive) CP.
 The complementizer occupies C position in the upper CP.
 The finite verb moves to the C position in the lower CP.

See also

 Second position clitics

Notes

Literature
Adger, D. 2003. Core syntax: A minimalist approach. Oxford, UK: Oxford University Press.
Ágel, V., L. Eichinger, H.-W. Eroms, P. Hellwig, H. Heringer, and H. Lobin (eds.) 2003/6. Dependency and valency: An international handbook of contemporary research. Berlin: Walter de Gruyter.
Andrason, A. (2020). Verb second in Wymysorys. Oxford University Press.
Borsley, R. 1996. Modern phrase structure grammar. Cambridge, MA: Blackwell Publishers.
Carnie, A. 2007. Syntax: A generative introduction, 2nd edition. Malden, MA: Blackwell Publishing.
Emonds, J. 1976. A transformational approach to English syntax: Root, structure-preserving, and local transformations. New York: Academic Press.
Fagan, S. M. B. 2009. German: A linguistic introduction. Cambridge: Cambridge University Press
Fischer, O., A. van Kermenade, W. Koopman, and W. van der Wurff. 2000. The Syntax of Early English. Cambridge: Cambridge University Press.
Fromkin, V. et al. 2000. Linguistics: An introduction to linguistic theory. Malden, MA: Blackwell Publishers.
Harbert, Wayne. 2007. The Germanic Languages. Cambridge: Cambridge University Press.
Hook, P. E. 1976. Is Kashmiri an SVO Language? Indian Linguistics 37: 133–142.
Jouitteau, M. (2020). Verb second and the left edge filling trigger. Oxford University
Liver, Ricarda. 2009. Deutsche Einflüsse im Bündnerromanischen. In Elmentaler, Michael (Hrsg.) Deutsch und seine Nachbarn. Peter Lang. 
König, E. and J. van der Auwera (eds.). 1994. The Germanic Languages. London and New York: Routledge.
Liver, Ricarda. 2009. Deutsche Einflüsse im Bündnerromanischen. In Elmentaler, Michael (Hrsg.) Deutsch und seine Nachbarn. Frankfurt am Main: Peter Lang. 
Meelen, M. (2020). Reconstructing the rise of verb second in welsh. Oxford University Press. 
Nichols, Johanna. 2011. Ingush Grammar. Berkeley: University of California Press.
Osborne T. 2005. Coherence: A dependency grammar analysis. SKY Journal of Linguistics 18, 223–286.
Ouhalla, J. 1994. Transformational grammar: From rules to principles and parameters. London: Edward Arnold.
Peters, P. 2013. The Cambridge Dictionary of English Grammar. Cambridge: Cambridge University Press.
Posner, R. 1996. The Romance languages. Cambridge: Cambridge University Press.
Rowlett, P. 2007. The Syntax of French. Cambridge: Cambridge University Press.
van Riemsdijk, H. and E. Williams. 1986. Introduction to the theory of grammar. Cambridge, MA: The MIT Press.
Tesnière, L. 1959. Éleménts de syntaxe structurale. Paris: Klincksieck.
Thráinsson, H. 2007. The Syntax of Icelandic. Cambridge: Cambridge University Press.
Walkden, G. (2017). Language contact and V3 in germanic varieties new and old. The Journal of Comparative Germanic Linguistics, 20(1), 49-81.
Woods, R. (2020). A different perspective on embedded verb second. Oxford University Press.
Woods, R., Wolfe, s., & UPSO eCollections. (2020). Rethinking verb second (First ed.). Oxford University Press.
Zwart, J-W. 2011. The Syntax of Dutch. Cambridge: Cambridge University Press.

Linguistic typology
Word order